Steve A. Kren, Jr. is an American politician from Idaho. Kren is a former Republican member of Idaho House of Representatives.

Early life 
Kren was born in Nampa, Idaho. Kren's father was a councilman in Nampa, Idaho.

Career 
Kren is an electrical contractor and a Vice President of Stephen's Electric.

On November 4, 2008, Kren won the election and became a Republican member of Idaho House of Representatives for District 13, seat B. Kren defeated Byron Yankey with 70.2% of the votes. On May 25, 2010, as an incumbent, Kren lost the primary election for District 13, seat B. Kren was defeated by Christy Perry.

Personal life 
Kren's wife is Kalah Kren. They have three children, Jack, Halle, and Sophie. Kren and his family live in Nampa, Idaho.

References

External links 
 Stephen Kren Jr. at ballotpedia.org
 Whoops Not that Steve Kren at spokesman
 Changes in Idaho Senate GOP could make it resemble the House (May 26, 2010)

Living people
Republican Party members of the Idaho House of Representatives
Year of birth missing (living people)